The Journal of Asian Security and International Affairs   is an international peer reviewed academic journal that provides platform for discussion on domestic and international political issues and developments with national and regional security concerns and implications.

The Journal focuses on the main sub-regions of Asia – Central and West Asia; South Asia; Northeast Asia; Southeast Asia; and Australasia.

The journal is a member of the Committee on Publication Ethics (COPE).

External links 
 
 Homepage

References 

 COPE

SAGE Publishing academic journals
Publications established in 2014
International relations journals
Political science journals
Triannual journals